The Associate (Spanish: El socio) is a 1946 Mexican drama film directed by Roberto Gavaldón and starring Hugo del Carril, Gloria Marín and Nelly Montiel. It is based on Jenaro Prieto's 1928 novel The Partner in which a financially struggling man invents a fictitious business partner in order to try to improve his prospects.

The film's sets were designed by the art director Manuel Fontanals.

Cast 
 Hugo del Carril as Julián Pardo
 Gloria Marín as Anita Velasco
 Nelly Montiel as Graciela
 Clifford Carr as Samuel Goldenberg
 Rafael Alcayde as Luis
 Federico Mariscal as Pedrito
 Octavio Martínez as Sr. Gutiérrez
 José Morcillo as Coronel Ramírez
 Vicente Padula as Don Fortunato
 Luis G. Barreiro as Don Ramiro
 Roberto Meyer as Cipriano
 Juan Pulido as Inventor
 Raymundo Guízar
 Beatriz Ramos as Esposa de Davis
 Susana Guízar as Leonor
 Daniel Arroyo as Hombre jugando billar
 René Cardona as Corredor de bolsa
 Roberto Corell
 Joaquín Coss as Asistente de notario
 Fernando Curiel as Corredor de bolsa
 Alfonso Jiménez as Inventor
 José Muñoz as Corredor de bolsa
 Eduardo Noriega as Corredor de bolsa
 Félix Samper as Hombre jugando billar
 María Valdealde as Mujer con cuadro

References

Bibliography 
 Pilcher, Jeffrey M. Cantinflas and the Chaos of Mexican Modernity. Rowman & Littlefield, 2001.

External links 
 

1946 films
1946 drama films
Mexican drama films
1940s Spanish-language films
Films directed by Roberto Gavaldón
Mexican black-and-white films
Films based on Chilean novels
Films scored by Manuel Esperón
1940s Mexican films